The women's 113.1 km road race competition at the 2006 Asian Games was held on 4 December at the Cycling Street Circuit.

Schedule
All times are Arabia Standard Time (UTC+03:00)

Results 
Legend
DNF — Did not finish

References

External links 
 

Road Women